Bethany Congregational Church or Bethany United Church of Christ is a historic Congregational church located at West Terre Haute, Vigo County, Indiana. It was built between 1907 and 1909, and is a Victorian Gothic-style church built of stone, brick and limestone. It features and octagonal corner bell tower and Gothic arched windows. The architect was Charles Padgett.

Bethany Congregational Church was placed on the National Register of Historic Places for its architectural significance in 2003.

References

Churches on the National Register of Historic Places in Indiana
Gothic Revival church buildings in Indiana
Churches completed in 1909
United Church of Christ churches in Indiana
Churches in Vigo County, Indiana
National Register of Historic Places in Vigo County, Indiana
Congregational churches in Indiana